Lake Lucerne, a somewhat round lake, has a surface area of . Lake Lucerne is in an area that is rural-suburban in nature. This lake is completely surrounded by residences and a few undeveloped housing lots.  Lake Lucerne is northeast of Winter Haven, Florida.

As Lake Lucerne is completely surrounded by private property, there is no public access to this lake. There also is no information about the types of fish in the lake.

References

Lucerne